Ihor Lapin (born 28 May 1969, in Ivanychi) is a Ukrainian lawyer and politician, who is a former (2014-2019) People's Deputy of Ukraine. During the War in Donbass (eastern Ukraine) he was commander of the 2nd assault squadron "West" of the 24th Battalion of Territorial Defense "Aidar" of the Armed Forces of Ukraine, formed mainly from volunteers from Volyn Oblast. Before the war, he worked as a lawyer, and was a member of the Bar Qualification-Disciplinary Commission of Volyn Oblast.

Biography 
Lapin was born on 28 May 1969 in Ivanychi, Volyn Oblast, Ukraine (then part of the USSR). In 1986 he graduated from high school number 1 in Kovel. In the same year he entered the historical faculty of the Lutsk Pedagogical Institute. After a year of study he went to serve in the army.

1988-1992 - Kurgan higher military-political aviation school (KVVPAU), officer with higher military specialty "social teacher". Received diploma with honors.

He swore an oath to the people of Ukraine in 1992.

From 1992 to 1996 he served as a part of the aerodrome operation company of the Lutsk Air Base (military unit 42198). He was deputy commander of the aerodrome operation company and  promoted to the rank of senior lieutenant. He was released to a reserve unit for health reasons.

1993-1997 he studied law at the Ivan Franko National University of Lviv.

From 1997 to 2014 he worked as a lawyer of the Volyn Regional Bar Association, and was member of the Bar Qualification-Disciplinary Commission of the Volyn Region. 

Since December 2013, he took an active part in the Euromaidan.

In June 2014 - he went to serve in the Armed Forces of Ukraine (Volunteer).

2017 - received the title of captain.

Russian-Ukrainian War 

From  the June 2014, a member of the ATO, was elected as the commander of the 2nd assault squadron "West" of the 24th Battalion of Territorial Defense "Aidar" (military unit PP V 0624), which is subordinated to the Armed Forces of Ukraine. More known as "Zola",  because of that his assault squadron was called "zolushky".

During the ATO, he was distinguished as a professional and responsible commander. Under his command, eight settlements were dismissed in Luhansk Oblast, in particular, Shchastia, Georgievka, Lutugino, Uspenska, Novosvitlivka and Khryaschuvate, and other strategically important objects.

"Zola's" assault division took part in Krasny Yar dismission. During  dismission of Vergunsky Rozizd near Luhansk destroyed members of Special Operations Forces (Russia) called "Gyurza" and part of  "Batman's" group.

Georgiivka dismissing under "Zola" command marked as a breakthrough in the blockade of the Luhansk Airport. 

After the 2014 Ukrainian parliamentary election, the People's deputy of Ukraine Ihor Lapin goes to the zone of the ATO to help soldiers, shoving and teaching them skills and experience of conducting military operations.

Public and political activity 
In 2010 Ihor Lapin ran for the position of mayor of Kovel, with the support of the "Country Party".

On August 14, 2014, he became a member of the Military Council of the Political Party "People's Front".

In the October 2014 Ukrainian parliamentary election, he was elected to the Verkhovna Rada (Ukraine's parliament) with the support of the "People's Front " in the single-mandate majority district No. 22 in Lutsk with 24.24% of the votes. A member of the "People's Front", he sat on the Verkhovna Rada Committee for Legal Policy and Justice. First Deputy Chairman of the Special Control Privatization Commission of the Verkhovna Rada of Ukraine. Gains for patriotic and military education, for the creation of territorial defense units and reserve army. Defended state interests in matters of privatization of key objects. Advocated for the recognition Russia as an aggressor state and the fact of a war with Russia on the territory of Ukraine.

In the 2019 Ukrainian parliamentary election Lapin was not high enough on the election list (placed 49th) of European Solidarity to get reelected. The party won 23 seats on the nationwide party list and two constituency seats.

Awards 
 Recipient of the Order of Bohdan Khmelnytsky, 3rd class (December 26, 2014) — for personal courage and heroism, discovered in defense of state sovereignty and territorial integrity of Ukraine
 President's of Ukraine award - jubilee medal "25 years of independence of Ukraine" (2016)
 Award of the Main Directorate of Military Intelligence of the Ministry of Defense of Ukraine "For the assistance of the Military Intelligence of Ukraine" I degree.
 Award of the Main Directorate of Military Intelligence of the Ministry of Defense of Ukraine "For the assistance of the Military Intelligence of Ukraine" ІІ  degree.
 Award of the Main Directorate of Military Intelligence of the Ministry of Defense of Ukraine "Eugene Bereznyak".
 Award from the Minister of Internal Affairs of Ukraine - firearm.

Notes

External links

Recipients of the Order of Bohdan Khmelnytsky, 3rd class
1969 births
Eighth convocation members of the Verkhovna Rada
21st-century Ukrainian lawyers
People of the Euromaidan
Living people